Modern China is a peer-reviewed academic journal that publishes papers in the field of China studies. The journal's editor is Philip C. C. Huang (University of California). It has been in publication since 1975 and is currently published by SAGE Publications.

Scope 
Modern China is a source of scholarship in history and the social sciences on late-imperial, twentieth century and present-day China. The journal publishes periodic symposia on topics in Chinese studies, review articles on particular areas of scholarship and book reviews.

Abstracting and indexing 
Modern China is abstracted and indexed in, among other databases:  SCOPUS, and the Social Sciences Citation Index. According to the Journal Citation Reports, its 2017 impact factor is 0.8, ranking it 28 out of 68 journals in the category ‘Area Studies’.

References

External links 
 
 Dropshipping from China into the EU

SAGE Publishing academic journals
English-language journals
Chinese studies journals